This is a list of notable people, of all ethnicities, born in the Republic of Moldova, the Moldovan SSR or the historical province of Bessarabia.

Artists and architects
Baruch Agadati (1895-1976), Palestinian-Israeli classical ballet dancer, choreographer, painter, and film producer and director
 Tudor Cataraga, sculptor
 Nachum Gutman (1898-1980), Teleneşti-born Israeli painter, sculptor, and author
 Andrei Mudrea, painter
 Alexandru Plămădeală, sculptor
 Mihai Petric, painter
 Alexey Shchusev, Russian architect
 Tudor Zbârnea, painter

Writers
 Alexandru Donici, poet and translator
 Ion Creanga, writer
 Alexei Mateevici, poet and publicist
 Alexandru Hâjdeu, writer
 Alecu Russo, writer
 Bogdan Petriceicu-Hașdeu, writer and historian
 Constantin Stamati, writer and translator
 Constantin Stamati-Ciurea, writer and translator
 Constantin Stere, writer
 Dumitru Matcovschi, poet
 Grigore Vieru, poet and writer
 Ion Anton, poet and writer
 Ion Druță, novelist
 Ion Vatamanu, poet
 Ion Hadârcă, writer
 Lidia Kulikovski (born 1951), librarian, bibliographer and editor
 Liviu Damian, poet
 Mihai Eminescu, poet, novelist, and journalist
 Petru Cărare, poet and epigrammatist
 Sorana Gurian, writer
 Vasile Vasilache, writer
 Victor Teleucă, writer and poet
 Vladimir Beșleagă, novelist

Musicians
 Eugen Doga
 Maria Bieșu
 Maria Cebotari
 Sofia Rotaru
 Anatol Dumitras 
 Nicolae Glib
 Anastasia Lazariuc
 Ion Suruceanu
 Nelly Ciobanu
 Zdob şi Zdub
 Anna Odobescu singer and actress
 Valentina Naforniță, soprano opera singer
 Dan Bălan, pop singer
 Natalia Barbu, pop singer
 Maria Bieșu, opera singer
 Geta Burlacu, singer
 Maria Cebotari, opera-singer
 Mihai Dolgan, pop singer
 Valeriu Găină, guitarist
 Lidia Isac, pop singer
 Radu Marian, opera singer
 Sofia Rotaru, pop singer
 Radu Sîrbu, pop singer
 Pavel Stratan, folk singer
 Vika Jigulina, pop singer made famous for her hit Stereo Love
 Mark Zeltser, concert pianist
 Andrew Rayel, trance producer and DJ
 Sergey Stepanov, saxophonist, feminist

Composers
 Ion Aldea-Teodorovici, singer
 Eugen Coca
 Eugen Doga
 Arkady Luxemburg
 Gavriil Musicescu
 Stefan Neaga

Scientists
 Lev Berg, Russian biologist and geographer
 Ștefan Ciobanu, historian
 Nicolae Donici, astronomer
 Jerzy Neyman, Polish statistician
 Sergiu Rădăuțan, physicist
 Nikolay Sclifosovsky, Russian surgeon and physiologist
 Nicolae Testemițanu, physician, surgeon and hygienist
 Nikolay Dimitrievich Zelinskiy, Russian chemist
 George de Bothezat (Gheorghe Botezatu), engineer and pioneer of helicopter flight

Athletes
 Radu Albot (born 1989), first Moldovan tennis player to win an ATP title
 Olga Bolşova (born 1968), athlete
 Alexandru Bratan (born 1977), weightlifter
 Serghei Covalciuc (born 1982), football player
 Ion Gonța, (born 1978), boxer
 Vitalie Grușac
 Nicolae Juravschi
 Fedor Kassapu
 Boris Polak (born 1954), Israeli world champion and Olympic sport shooter
 Naum Prokupets
 Alex Sherman
 Sergey Spivak, UFC fighter
 Andrei Tchmil
 Vadim Vacarciuc

Businessmen
 Anatol Stati
 Gabriel Stati
 Ion Sturza
 Oleg Voronin
 Sam Zemurray

Politicians
 Dumitru Braghiș, former chairman of the Party for Social Democracy, former MP, former Prime Minister of Moldova
 Dorin Chirtoacă, mayor of Chișinău
 Dumitru Diacov, honorary chairman of the Democratic Party, MP, former speaker of  Parliament
 Vladimir Filat, former Prime Minister of Moldova, the Liberal-Democratic Party leader
 Mihai Ghimpu, chairman of the Liberal Party, MP
 Victor Guzun, Ambassador of the Republic of Moldova to Estonia
 Avigdor Lieberman, Moldovan-born Israeli Minister of Finance
 Petru Lucinschi, former President of Democratic Party, MP, former speaker of the  Parliament
 Alexandru Moșanu, historian, former speaker of Parliament
 Iurie Roșca, chairman of the Christian-Democratic Peoples Party, former deputy speaker of the  Parliament
 Oleg Serebrian, political scientist and diplomat, former chairman of the Social-Liberal Party, former MP
 Mircea Snegur, former President of Moldova (3 Sept 1990 - 15 Jan 1997)
 Vasile Tarlev, former Prime Minister of Moldova
 Stepan Topal, Gagauz politician and activist
 Serafim Urechean, former chairman of the "Our Moldova Alliance", former MP
 Vladimir Voronin, former President of Moldova (7 Apr 2001 - 11 Sep 2009)

Other
 Daria Harjevschi (1862-1934), librarian who improved the services of the Chișinău Public Library
 Xenia Deli, fashion model

See also
 Moldovans
 Romanians
 List of Romanians
 Bessarabia
 Benderli Pashas
 List of rulers of Moldavia

References

External links
  Scientists from the Republic of Moldova